Haryanvi cinema, is the Haryanvi language film industry in the state of Haryana in India.

History

Chandrawal, released in 1984 was the first financially successful Haryanvi film.

Laado, released in 2000, another successful film starring Ashutosh Rana and directed by Ashwini Chaudhary, won the Indira Gandhi Award for Best Debut Film of a Director at the National Film Awards. This was the first time a Haryanvi movie won a national award.

Pagdi The Honour, released in 2014, received two National Film Awards at the 62nd National Film Awards. Baljinder Kaur won National Film Award for Best Supporting Actress for her role in this film and the film won the National Film Award for Best Feature Film in Haryanvi.

Satrangi won the 63rd National Film Awards for the best Haryanvi film in 2016. For Satrangi Yashpal sharma received the Best Actor Award in JIFF in 2018. Satrangi won six awards in the Haryana International film festival, Hisar in 2017.

Festivals

Film artists

Female

 Anjali Raghav
 Kavita Joshi
 Usha Sharma

Male

 Arun Bali
 Ashutosh Rana
 Baljinder Kaur
 Gurdaas Maan
 Jagat Jakhar
 Jaideep Ahlawat
 Masoom Sharma
 Neeraj
 Om Puri
 Raja Bundela
 Rajendra Gupta
 Rajesh Vedprakash
 Rajkummar Rao
 Randeep Hooda
 Satyajeet
 Satish Kaushik
 Sri Vallabh Vyas 
 Uttar Kumar

Directors
 Rajeev Bhatia
 Sundeep Sharma
 Surinder Walia
 Robin Sharaya

Cinematographers
 Neeraj Jangra

List of Haryanvi language films

 Beera Shera
 Dharti
 Bahurani
 Chandrawal
 Chander Kiran
 Laado Basanti
 Phool Badan
 Jhanakdar Kangana
 Bairee
 Bataeu
 Chabilee
 Chail Gabharu
 Chail Gaelyan Jaangi
 Chand Chakori
 Chandro
 Chora Haryane Ka
 Chora Jat Ka
 Gulaabo
 Jatani
 Ke Supney Ka Jikar
 Lambardaar
 Mahara Pihar Sansara
 Mahari Dharti Mahari Maa
 Muklava
 Panghat
 Phaagan Aaya Re
 Phool Badan
 Piya
 Premi Ramphal
 Yaari
 Laado 
 Dhakar Chhora
 Muthbhed - A Planned Encounter 
 Chandrawal-2 
 Tera Mera Vaada
 Modern Girl Desi Chhora
 Maati Kare Pukar
 London Ki Chhori
 Kunba
 Tere Te Pyar Hoya

 Yeh Kaisa Pal Do Pal Ka Pyaar
 Kurbani Ek Junoon
 Pagdi The Honour 
 Satrangi

See also

 Haryana
 Administrative divisions of Haryana
 Haryanvi culture
 Haryanvi cultural tourism
 Haryanvi folk dances
 Haryanvi language
 Haryanvi music
 Haryanvi people
 Haryanvi Raagni
 List of Haryanvi-language films
 Haryanvi saang

 General
 Bollywood
 Hindi Cinema
 Hindi Cinema
 Indian musical instruments
 List of Indian folk dances

References

 
Haryanavi culture